Vodka Cruiser is a brightly coloured vodka-based alcoholic drink, with an alcohol content of 5%. Sometimes described as an alcopop, this premixed drink is available in seventeen flavours, including guava, lemon, lime, passion fruit, pineapple, raspberry, and other flavors depending on location. The product originates from New Zealand, and is produced by Asahi Premium Beverages, formerly known as Independent Liquor.

Vodka Cruisers normally come in 275 ml (9.3 oz) bottles, so each bottle contains slightly less alcohol than a standard shot. In 2022, Asahi Australia launched a range of limited-edition 3.1L "Double Magnum" sized bottles, containing the volume of roughly 11 regular cruisers, which could be won in a giveaway to celebrate the brand's 21st birthday.

Varieties 
In late 2003, Independent Liquor introduced a "Cruiser Black" range, containing a higher alcohol volume than standard varieties. In New Zealand, Vodka Cruisers are also available in a 7% alcohol, premium formulation sold in cardboard packages containing 12 cans of 250 ml each. According to the package labelling, each can has an alcohol content equivalent to 1.6 standard drinks, though the New Zealand definition of a standard drink would place one can at 1.75 standard drinks.

In 2009, Independent Distillers attempted to expand the Cruiser brand across a larger range of premix alcoholic beverages with the introduction of new female-oriented drinks, including the ready-to-drink line "Lady Luck", which contained half the sugar of a standard vodka cruiser, a blonde lager under the name "Hummingbird", and a cider under the name of "Apparella". Each of these product lines were available for a short period before being discontinued. 

In 2012, Asahi Breweries announced the reformulation of the Vodka Cruiser product line in Australia, introducing six new core flavours to replace the original lineup while reducing the drink's sugar content.

In 2022, Asahi released 600ml long neck versions of the Guava and Raspberry Vodka Cruiser flavours for a limited time in Australia, following demand from fans on social media.

Flavours

Australia 
Standard Flavours: Juicy Watermelon, Wild Raspberry, Lush Guava, Pure Pineapple, Zesty Lemon-Lime, Bold Berry, Sunny Orange Passionfruit, and Ripe Strawberry.

Sugar-Free: Mixed Berry, Mango Raspberry, and Strawberry Watermelon.

Mudshakes: Original Chocolate, Classic Cowboy, and Espresso Martini. 

Originals: Black Cherry, Electric Pink (pink grapefruit), Pom Pom (pomegranate), Blueberry, Carnivale (toffee-apple), Ice (citrus), and Pine Lime. 

Limited Edition: Pale Lime & Strawberry, Soft Peach, Crisp Pear, Scrumptious Boysenberry, Sour Apple, Sour Grape, and Apple Blackcurrant.

New Zealand 
Standard Flavours: Cool Lime, Very Blueberry, Zesty Watermelon, Pure Passionfruit, Bold Blackcurrant & Apple, Juicy Mango Raspberry, Wild Raspberry, and Crisp Ice.

Discontinued: Pineapple, Guava, Electric Pink, Pom Pom, Black Cherry, Exotic Fruits.

Limited Edition: Strawberry Kiwi, Wild Berry, Lush Strawberry & Lemon, Tropical Peach & Mango Sorbet.

References 

Alcopops
Asahi Breweries
Cocktails with vodka